Dr. Killem "Kal" Seaman (December 7, 1915 – March 2, 2008) was a Canadian politician. He served in the Legislative Assembly of New Brunswick from 1987 to 1991 as a Liberal member from the constituency of Kings Centre.

References

1915 births
2008 deaths